Parenthood is an American family comedy-drama television series developed by Jason Katims and produced by Imagine Television and Universal Television for NBC. The show tells of the Braverman clan, consisting of an older couple, their four children, and their families.

Loosely based on the 1989 film of the same name, the series is the second adaptation of the film to air on television, preceded by the 1990–91 TV series, which also aired on NBC. Following the release of  Friday Night Lights, Katims approached Ron Howard and Brian Grazer with the idea of creating an updated, modern adaptation of the 1989 film and bringing it to television.

The series ran for six seasons from March 6, 2010 to January 29, 2015. The series was well received by television critics and earned several nominations and awards, including one Vision Award, a Critics' Choice Television Award, two Television Academy Honors awards, four Young Artist Awards, and three Entertainment Industries Council PRISM Awards. Despite positive reviews, the series never gained a strong audience; the pilot received the highest audience figures, with ratings declining thereafter.

The sixth and final season, consisting of 13 episodes, premiered on September 25, 2014. The series finale aired on January 29, 2015.

Series overview 

The series is set in Berkeley, California on the east shore of the San Francisco Bay. The show revolves around three generations of the Braverman family: the patriarch Ezekiel "Zeek" Braverman, the matriarch Camille Braverman, and the families of their four children Adam, Sarah, Crosby, and Julia. Adam is married to Kristina and they have three children, Haddie, Max and Nora. Max is diagnosed with Asperger's. Sarah is divorced from Seth and has two teen children, Amber and Drew. Crosby is married to Jasmine and has a son, Jabbar, and a daughter Aida. Julia is married to Joel and has a daughter, Sydney, and a son, Victor, whom they adopted after finding themselves unable to conceive a second child.

Cast and characters 

 Peter Krause as Adam Braverman
 Lauren Graham as Sarah Braverman
 Dax Shepard as Crosby Braverman
 Monica Potter as Kristina Braverman
 Erika Christensen as Julia Braverman-Graham
 Sam Jaeger as Joel Graham
 Savannah Paige Rae as Sydney Graham
 Sarah Ramos as Haddie Braverman (main seasons 1–3; recurring season 4; guest seasons 5 & 6)
 Max Burkholder as Max Braverman
 Joy Bryant as Jasmine Trussell
 Miles Heizer as Drew Holt
 Mae Whitman as Amber Holt
 Bonnie Bedelia as Camille Braverman
 Craig T. Nelson as Ezekiel "Zeek" Braverman
 Tyree Brown as Jabbar Trussell (recurring season 1; main seasons 2–6)
 Xolo Maridueña as Victor Graham (guest season 3; main seasons 4–6)

Production

Development 
Parenthood is based on the 1989 film of the same name, co-written and directed by Ron Howard. Following the release of the film, a television series was created and aired in 1990 on NBC but turned out to be unsuccessful and was cancelled after one season. Nearly two decades later, Jason Katims, the showrunner of Friday Night Lights, met with Howard and Brian Grazer to ask them to readapt the film on television, which they accepted though they were reluctant at first. The show was given the green-light from NBC in January 2009, and Katims finished writing the pilot script in early 2009.

Casting 
Erika Christensen was the first actress to land a role in the pilot in early March 2009. By the end of the month, Peter Krause, Maura Tierney, Dax Shepard, Mae Whitman, Sarah Ramos and Craig T. Nelson were all attached to the drama. Nelson came aboard the project after passing on the role of the grandfather in Modern Family. In April, Max Burkholder was chosen to portray Peter Krause's son. In that same month Bonnie Bedelia, Sam Jaeger and Monica Potter were cast. Diane Farr was originally chosen as Kristina Braverman, but she quickly left the series due to scheduling conflicts with Californication and was replaced by Potter.

The series was originally scheduled to premiere on NBC on September 23, 2009. However, on July 10, 2009, it was announced that Parenthood would be pushed back to midseason due to Tierney's breast cancer diagnosis. On September 10, 2009, a spokesperson for Tierney announced that she was leaving the show because of conflicts with her treatment schedule. Tierney's already-filmed scenes were deleted. On October 9, 2009, it was reported that Lauren Graham would replace Tierney in the upcoming series. Helen Hunt had been approached, but she and NBC could not come to a financial deal. The pilot was reshot in November.

Max Burkholder, who portrays a boy who has Asperger's, explained how they ensure his portrayal is accurate:  Ray Romano joined the cast, in the role of Hank Rizzoli on September 11, 2012. The role was specifically created for him after he expressed his love for the show and met with Katims on the set of Friday Night Lights.

Filming 
Production for the first season began in 2009 with Katims as executive producer, serving as showrunner and head writer; he also directed a few episodes later in the series. The pilot episode was filmed in Northern California, using local crews, while the rest of the series was filmed in Los Angeles.

As in Katims's other show, Friday Night Lights, three cameras were used for shooting, placed at both sides of a scene. There usually were no table reads prior to the filming of an episode, a process often used in other television shows.

Broadcast history 
In the aftermath of Maura Tierney's departure, the premiere date that was originally set for September 23, 2009, was moved to March 1, 2010, at 9:00 p.m., but it was again delayed to the following day at 10:00 p.m. in the aftermath of The Jay Leno Show cancellation and 2010 Tonight Show conflict, requiring the return of scripted programming to the later time slot. The series premiered on March 2, 2010, at 10:00 p.m., on NBC, following The Biggest Loser. The series premiere was dedicated to the memory of Nora O'Brien, a vice president at NBC, who died on the set of Parenthood on April 29, 2009, after collapsing from an aneurysm.

On April 20, 2010, Parenthood was renewed for a second season by NBC, as reported by Variety. The second season premiered September 14, 2010. Later that year on November 15, it was announced that Parenthood would be moving to Mondays at 10/9c beginning March 7. However, due to an overhaul of NBC's Law & Order: Los Angeles putting the show on an indefinite hiatus, the network announced on January 18, 2011, that Parenthood would remain in the Tuesday 10/9c time slot.

On May 12, 2011, Parenthood was renewed for a third season and premiered at 10:00 p.m. on September 13. On May 10, 2012, NBC renewed Parenthood for a 15-episode fourth season. On April 26, 2013, NBC renewed Parenthood for a fifth season, with 22 episodes. On May 11, 2014, NBC renewed Parenthood for a sixth and final season, with 13 episodes, after a stand-off with the cast which has seen their episode guarantee reduced.

On April 3, 2015, NickMom, a block carried as part of the American cable network Nick Jr., began to carry the series in cable syndication, mainly as part of weekend and weeknight blocks, until it ended operations on September 28, 2015. The rights have since moved to UP (which also carries Gilmore Girls repeats), uniting both of Lauren Graham's main series on the same network for cable syndication.

Beginning on December 15, 2015, all six seasons of Parenthood were available for streaming on Netflix. Parenthood was removed from Netflix on September 25, 2019.

In August 2016, Katims was interviewed by TV Line about a potential revival of the series. He said:"It would start at the moment when I feel like I have a story to tell," he admitted. "But the whole thing about Parenthood is the kids get a little older and their lives change and then there's more story to tell. I feel like that will happen at some point. And then it will be a question of, logistically, can we get the actors [back together] at the same time? And then we have to [find an outlet] that wants to [air] it."

Soundtracks 

On August 31, 2010, Arrival Records/Scion Music Group released a soundtrack for the first season of Parenthood. The soundtrack consists of 10 songs including the theme song for Parenthood, "Forever Young" by Bob Dylan, and the international theme, "When We Were Young" by Lucy Schwartz. The soundtrack also includes a cover of "Forever Young" performed by John Doe and Lucy Schwartz.

Andrew McMahon, of the band Jack's Mannequin, revealed in speaking about the band's album, People and Things, that the song "Casting Lines" was written after he was contacted by producers of the show as a possible theme song for the series. After recording the song and sending it to producers, he was told they appreciated his efforts but they had selected "Forever Young" as the show's theme song. The song does appear on Jack's Mannequin's third album, People and Things.

 Track listing
 "Forever Young" – Bob Dylan
 "Darlin' Do Not Fear" – Brett Dennen
 "Colors" – Amos Lee
 "Kick Drum Heart" – The Avett Brothers
 "Put Your Records On" – Corinne Bailey Rae
 "In My Dreams" – Eels
 "Change of Time" – Josh Ritter
 "When We Were Young" – Lucy Schwartz
 "In These Arms" – The Swell Season
 "Solitaire" – Wilco
 "Let It Be Me" – Ray LaMontagne
 "Forever Young" – John Doe and Lucy Schwartz

A second soundtrack was released on October 8, 2013, through J-2 Music. It was produced by Jason Katims and Liza Richardson among others and features songs heard from the second to the fourth season.

 Track listing
 "Dance In The Graveyards" - Delta Rae
 "If I Had A Boat" - Lyle Lovett
 "Piece Of My Heart" (Live Recording) - CeeLo Green 
 "What I Wouldn't Do" - A Fine Frenzy
 "Man On Fire (Little Daylight Remix)" - Edward Sharpe and the Magnetic Zeros 
 "Honey I'll Try" - Emile Millar
 "Take A Bow" - Greg Laswell
 "Hard Times (Come Again No More)" - Brett Dennen
 "Lady Adelaide" - Benjamin Gibbard
 "My My Love" - Joshua Radin
 "High Hope" - Glen Hansard

Reception

Critical response 
Parenthood's first season received generally positive reviews from critics, scoring a 61 out of 100 on the review aggregator Metacritic. Alessandra Stanley of The New York Times said Parenthood is "unexpectedly compelling" despite being reminiscent of Brothers & Sisters. She praised the writing and the cast and described the show as "a coming-of-age drama for all ages". Alan Sepinwall, writing for The Star-Ledger in Newark, wrote that "Like the movie that inspired it, Parenthood isn't an instant classic, but it's smart and warm and knowing, and it casts its net so wide that at least part of it should connect with you." Ken Tucker of Entertainment Weekly wrote, "Parenthood isn't better than Modern Family, but it's different—it's its own creation, thanks to the deft touch and careful characterizations developed by executive producer Jason Katims and his writers."

Following the second season's premiere, Tucker of Entertainment Weekly wrote: "As the series has proceeded, what initially looked like a bunch of talented but disparate actors has cohered into a believable clan." The Huffington Post Maureen Ryan called it a "solidly rewarding drama" which is "something to treasure on the TV schedule". Parenthood was furthermore praised for the way it tackles Asperger's. The moment during which Kristina and Adam explain to Max he has the syndrome was listed in TV Guide Top TV Moments of 2011.

Regarding the third season, The New Yorker writer Emily Nussbaum noted the show's positive development saying that it "has become stronger with each season". She deemed Parenthood one of only two great dramas on network television next to The Good Wife and cited its ability to be warm and sentimental without being dumb as one of its strengths. Sheri Levine of The Vancouver Sun wrote, "The cast moves effortlessly from providing serious, thoughtful answers to cracking jokes and allowing the funny moments to shine through. It's almost as though art is imitating life, or life imitating art." TIME magazine columnist James Poniewozik wrote that the show's "third and fourth seasons have elevated it to one of TV's best because of how it has hit a memorable theme from FNL: the idea of how community can be, inseparably, both a burden and indispensable support."

Upon the fourth-season premiere, The Washington Post TV columnist Jen Chaney called the show "a perfect piece of 'reali-scapism': A television show that tackles subjects many of us confront in our own lives and dips all of it in just enough escapism to make it enjoyable to watch." Rachel Stein of Television Without Pity felt that the show "possesses the same family bonding that Lorelai and Rory [of Gilmore Girls] had (times 18 for every member of this family), each episode has a lot of purposeful quirk and there's a certain quaintness about life that it captures in the Braverman clan." The season was listed as one of the 10 best seasons of television in 2012 in several publications, including the Cleveland Plain Dealer, the Contra Costa Times, The Daily Beast, HitFix, Salon.com, the St. Louis Post-Dispatch, TIME magazine, and TV Guide. Writing for The Daily Beast, Jace Lacob highlighted Monica Potter's "breathtaking" performance, whose cancer storyline was "poignant" and "gripping". Alan Sepinwall from HitFix commented: "this season's cancer storyline has brought a lot of what the show does well into even sharper focus, raising the stakes of almost every storyline in the process, and delivering fantastic, honestly tear-jerking performances."

Ratings

Accolades

Home media

Italian adaptation 
In December 2015 an adaptation of Parenthood entitled Tutto può succedere (Anything can happen) began broadcasting on the Italian state TV channel RaiUno. The plot follows the fortunes of the Ferraro family, based in various locations in and around Rome. Principal actors include Giorgio Colangeli as father/grandfather Ettore Ferraro, Licia Maglietta as mother/grandmother Emma and Maya Sansa as daughter/mother Sara.

See also 

 Touch (TV series)
 List of Parenthood characters

References

External links 
 Official website
 
 

 
2010 American television series debuts
2015 American television series endings
2010s American LGBT-related drama television series
2010 soundtrack albums
2013 soundtrack albums
English-language television shows
Lesbian-related television shows
NBC original programming
Serial drama television series
Live action television shows based on films
Television series about families
Television series by Universal Television
Television shows set in Berkeley, California
Autism in television
Television shows filmed in Los Angeles
Parenthood (franchise)
Television series by Imagine Entertainment
Television Academy Honors winners